Pondweed refers to many species and genera of aquatic plants and green algae:
Potamogeton, a diverse and worldwide genus
Elodea, found in North America
Aponogeton, in Africa, Asia and Australasia
Groenlandia, a genus of aquatic plants
Stuckenia, a genus of aquatic plants
Charales, an order of green algae